Vasily Mazheikov (born 1948) is a retired Soviet heavyweight weightlifter. In 1975 he won the Soviet title and placed second at the world and European championships.

References

1948 births
Living people
Soviet male weightlifters
World Weightlifting Championships medalists
Place of birth missing (living people)
Date of birth missing (living people)